A constitutional referendum was held in Gabon and Moyen Congo on 21 October 1945 as part of the wider French constitutional referendum. Both questions were approved by large margins. Voter turnout was 68.1%.

Results

Question I

Question II

References

1945 referendums
October 1945 events in Africa
1945
1945 in Gabon
1945
1945 in Moyen-congo
1945
Constitutional referendums in France
1945 elections in France